Albert Graeme McCartney (8 May 1933 – 17 July 2000) was an Australian rules footballer who played with Richmond in the Victorian Football League (VFL).

Notes

External links 

		
Graeme McCartney's playing statistics from The VFA Project

1933 births
2000 deaths
Australian rules footballers from Victoria (Australia)
Richmond Football Club players
Moorabbin Football Club players